Pablo Garcia may refer to:

Sports
 Pablo García (baseball) (1923–1997), Cuban professional baseball player
 Pablo García (basketball) (born 1946), Cuban basketball player
 Pablo García (footballer, born 1977), Uruguayan football defensive midfielder
 Pablo García (footballer, born 1985), Spanish footballer
 Pablo García (footballer, born 1999), Uruguayan football midfielder
 Pablo García (footballer, born 2000), Spanish football left back
 Pablo García (luger) (born 1967), Spanish luger

Others

 Pablo García Baena (1921–2018), Spanish poet
 Pablo Marcano García (born 1952), Puerto Rican painter
 Pablo García Pérez de Lara (born 1970), Spanish filmmaker
 Pablo García (musician) (born 1976), Spanish guitarist and member of the band WarCry
 Pablo P. Garcia (1925–2021), Filipino politician
 Pablo John Garcia (born 1967), his son, Filipino politician
 Pablo García Cejas (born 1982), Uruguayan serial killer

See also
 Juan Pablo García (born 1981), Mexican footballer
 Juan Pablo García (racing driver) (born 1987), Mexican racing driver